The Deputy Minister of Defence (Malay: Timbalan Menteri Pertahanan; ; Tamil: பாதுகாப்பு துணை அமைச்சர் ) is a Malaysian cabinet position serving as deputy head of the Ministry of Defence.

List of Deputy Ministers of Defence
The following individuals have been appointed as Deputy Minister of Defence, or any of its precedent titles:

Colour key (for political coalition/parties):

See also 
 Minister of Defence (Malaysia)

References 

Ministry of Defence (Malaysia)
Politics of Malaysia